Scaptomyza adusta is a species of fruit fly in the family Drosophilidae. It is found in Europe.

References

External links

 

Drosophilidae
Articles created by Qbugbot
Insects described in 1862